Every Time We Say Goodbye may refer to:

 Every Time We Say Goodbye (film), a 1986 American drama film 
 Every Time We Say Goodbye, the biography of foreign correspondent David Blundy by Anna Blundy
 "Every Time We Say Goodbye", a song by Brian McKnight from the 1997 album Anytime
 "Ev'ry Time We Say Goodbye", a jazz song with lyrics and music by Cole Porter

See also
 Every Time You Say Goodbye, a 1997 album by Alison Krauss & Union Station